Doubt is a 2009 Iranian Crystal Simorgh-winning film directed by Varuzh Karim Masihi. It is an adaptation of Shakespeare's Hamlet. Made after 17 years, Tardid is Karim Masihi's second feature film after Parde-ye Akhar (The Last Act).

Plot
Siavash Roozbehan is a young man and he has lost his father after his mysterious suicide. His uncle is managing his father's wealth. He is in love with his cousin Mahtab whose father is his uncle's councilor. Siavash gradually realizes that his uncle is going to marry his mother. After some days he also sees a lot of similarities between his own life and of Shakespeare's Hamlet. He goes to Garo, his best friend, and they try to change the end of the tragic story.

Cast
Note: Because most of  main characters in the film have a reference in Hamlet play the names in the parentheses are given for a better understanding of the film plot and are the external reference to Hamlet characters. 
Bahram Radan as Siavash Roozbehan - Hamlet
Taraneh Alidoosti as Mahtab - Ophelia
Alireza Shoja Noori as Siavash's uncle - Claudius
Hamed Komeili as Garo - Horatio
 Mahtab Keramati as	Varjavand
Mohammad Moti''' as Anvari - PoloniusAtash Garakani as Mah Tal'at - GertrudeAnoushirvan Arjmand as Khalife Farrokh Nemati as InspectorMahmood Pakniat as Uncle Matin		Kaveh Kavian as SamsamiOmid Roohani'' as Dr. Bonyadi

Awards
Crystal Simorgh for Best Film in 27th Fajr International Film Festival
Crystal Simorgh for Best Adapted Screenplay in 27th Fajr International Film Festival

References

External links

2009 films
Iranian drama films
Films based on Hamlet
Crystal Simorgh for Best Film winners